Central Gardens can refer to:
 Central Gardens, Memphis, USA
 Central Gardens, Texas, USA
 Central Gardens Nature Reserve, a popular picnic and recreational area in Merrylands, New South Wales, Australia